Estelle Duvin (born 1 February 1997) is a French ice hockey player and member of the French national team, currently signed with EV Bomo Thun of the Women's League (SWHL A).

She represented France at the 2019 IIHF Women's World Championship.

References

External links

1997 births
Living people
French expatriate ice hockey people
French expatriate sportspeople in Canada
French expatriate sportspeople in the United States
French women's ice hockey forwards
Maine Black Bears women's ice hockey players
Montreal Carabins women's ice hockey
Naisten Liiga All-Stars
TPS Naiset players